The Native Woodland Survey of Scotland (NWSS) has been developed by the Forestry Commission Scotland (FCS) to collect information that enables future monitoring of the extent and condition of the total Scottish native woodland resource and supports policy development. Field work started in 2006 and when completed by 2013 it will be the most comprehensive survey of its kind undertaken to date.

Survey aims
The aim of the Native Woodland Survey of Scotland is to identify all native, nearly native and plantation on ancient woodland sites (PAWS), woodlands of at least 0.5ha in order to create a woodland map linked to a spatial dataset showing the type, extent, composition and condition of these woods. PAWS are also surveyed, even where they are not mainly native in species composition in order to provide information to help maintain or restore their remaining biodiversity value.

Survey process
The field surveyors do a walk-through survey of every "candidate" woodland.
The surveyors follow the procedures laid out in a detailed protocol and record a range of attributes to describe and record the woodland and their boundaries.

Results
Summaries of the key results will be published for each local authority area in Scotland, in a series of reports on the NWSS web-pages on the Forestry Commission Scotland website. These will be followed by a national summary report. The spatial dataset can be looked at through  FCS Map Viewer and  Data Download site.
Guidance notes are available on the NWSS web-pages to help users interpret the data and consider further uses and analyses.

A copy of the survey plan, process, procedures and a full list of the features assessed can be found at  NWSS home website.

References

1) Nelson, D. 2010. The Native Woodland Survey of Scotland (NWSS). Scottish  Forestry Vol 64 (3). 
2) Robertson, P. & Grieve, Y. 2010. Quality Assuring a National Native Woodland Survey. Scottish  Forestry Vol 64 (4).
3) Grieve, Y. 2011. The Native Woodland Survey of Scotland dataset: what you get and how to get it! Scottish  Forestry Vol 65 (1).

Forests and woodlands of Scotland
Organisations based in Edinburgh
Environmental organisations based in Scotland
2006 establishments in Scotland
Government agencies established in 2006
Old-growth forests
Forestry in Scotland